In number theory, the divisor summatory function is a function that is a sum over the divisor function. It frequently occurs in the study of the asymptotic behaviour of the Riemann zeta function. The various studies of the behaviour of the divisor function are sometimes called divisor problems.

Definition
The divisor summatory function is defined as

where

is the divisor function. The divisor function counts the number of ways that the integer n can be written as a product of two integers. More generally, one defines

where dk(n) counts the number of ways that n can be written as a product of k numbers. This quantity can be visualized as the count of the number of lattice points fenced off by a hyperbolic surface in k dimensions.  Thus, for k=2, D(x) = D2(x) counts the number of points on a square lattice bounded on the left by the vertical-axis, on the bottom by the horizontal-axis, and to the upper-right by the hyperbola jk = x. Roughly, this shape may be envisioned as a hyperbolic simplex. This allows us to provide an alternative expression for D(x), and a simple way to compute it in  time:

, where 

If the hyperbola in this context is replaced by a circle then determining the value of the resulting function is known as the Gauss circle problem.

Sequence of D(n):
0, 1, 3, 5, 8, 10, 14, 16, 20, 23, 27, 29, 35, 37, 41, 45, 50, 52, 58, 60, 66, 70, 74, 76, 84, 87, 91, 95, 101, 103, 111, ...

Dirichlet's divisor problem
Finding a closed form for this summed expression seems to be beyond the techniques available, but it is possible to give approximations. The leading behavior of the series is given by

where  is the Euler–Mascheroni constant, and the error term is

Here,  denotes Big-O notation. This estimate can be proven using the Dirichlet hyperbola method, and was first established by Dirichlet in 1849.

holds true for all .  As of today, this problem remains unsolved. Progress has been slow. Many of the same methods work for this problem and for Gauss's circle problem, another lattice-point counting problem.  Section F1 of Unsolved Problems in Number Theory

surveys what is known and not known about these problems.

In 1904, G. Voronoi proved that the error term can be improved to  
In 1916, G. H. Hardy showed that .
In 1928, J. van der Corput proved that .
In 1950, Chih Tsung-tao and independently in 1953 H. E. Richert proved that .
In 1969, Grigori Kolesnik demonstrated that .
In 1973, Grigori Kolesnik demonstrated that .
In 1982, Grigori Kolesnik demonstrated that .
In 1988, H. Iwaniec and C. J. Mozzochi proved that .
In 2003, M.N. Huxley improved this to show that .

So,  lies somewhere between 1/4 and 131/416 (approx. 0.3149); it is widely conjectured to be 1/4.  Theoretical evidence lends credence to this conjecture, since  has a (non-Gaussian) limiting distribution.  The value of 1/4 would also follow from a conjecture on exponent pairs.

Piltz divisor problem
In the generalized case, one has

where  is a polynomial of degree . Using simple estimates, it is readily shown that

for integer . Computing these infima is known as the Piltz divisor problem, after the name of the German mathematician Adolf Piltz (also see his German page).

 

 and

  
 
E. C. Titchmarsh conjectures that

Mellin transform
Both portions may be expressed as Mellin transforms:

Here,  is the Riemann zeta function. Similarly, one has

In general, one has

Notes

References
 H.M. Edwards, Riemann's Zeta Function, (1974) Dover Publications,  
 E. C. Titchmarsh, The theory of the Riemann Zeta-Function, (1951) Oxford at the Clarendon Press, Oxford. (See chapter 12 for a discussion of the generalized divisor problem)
  (Provides an introductory statement of the Dirichlet divisor problem.)
 H. E. Rose. A Course in Number Theory., Oxford, 1988.
 M.N. Huxley (2003)  'Exponential Sums and Lattice Points III', Proc. London Math. Soc. (3)87: 591–609

Arithmetic functions
Lattice points
Unsolved problems in mathematics